Freezing Point may refer to:

Freezing Point (novel), a 1965 Japanese novel by Ayako Miura
Freezing Point, a 1967 South Korean film directed by Kim Soo-yong, based on the novel
Freezing Point (magazine), a Chinese magazine

See also
Melting point, the temperature of solid-liquid state change